Fra Serafino Razzi (Marradi 1531 – Florence 1613), was an Italian Dominican friar who in 1563 published a large collection of carnival songs in the lauda (song) genre. Razzi's collection Libro primo delle laudi spirituale is a miscellany of pieces of varying age and character from the music of Florence. It contains 91 lauda settings for one to four voices. Razzi travelled widely and kept diaries of his journeys.

Razzi's sister was the sculptor and nun Maria Angelica Razzi.

Works
 Istoria de gli huomini 1596
 Giardino d'essempi, ouero Fiori delle vite de' Santi 1599
 La storia di Raugia 1595
 La vita et institutioni del Giovan. Taulero (Johannes Tauler) 1590
 Vite dei santi, e beati cosi uomini, come donne del sacro ordine 1577

References

External links
Guide to Razzi, Serafino, Costumi e morte di Papa Alexxandro VI contrario Al P. F : Girolamo Savonarola da Ferrara del ordine de Predicatori. Manuscript, circa 1675 at the University of Chicago Special Collections Research Center

1531 births
1613 deaths
People from Marradi
Italian Dominicans
16th-century Italian composers
Italian male composers
16th-century Italian musicians